Ulodemis trigrapha is a moth of the family Tortricidae. It is found in Bhutan, Vietnam and India.

References

Moths described in 1907
Archipini